Plectroctena is an Afrotropical genus of ants, with most species occurring in the rainforest zones of West and Central Africa. Some species are cryptic or subterranean foragers, while others forage in open grassland terrain. The workers forage singly or in groups of 2 to 3. They nest in the earth at varying depths, or in collapsed logs. They prey mainly on millipedes, including their young or eggs.

Colony structure
A colony of P. lygaria (a small species of the mandibularis-group) may number in excess of 300 adults. An excavated colony in the Ivory Coast consisted of 277 workers, 8 alate queens, and 42 alate males. Consequently 15% of their number was allocated to reproductives at the specific time. The colony size of P. mandibularis however, seldom exceeds 50 individuals.

Nests
In a colony of P. lygaria, the nest chambers are located at shallow depth, in moist soil under dense leaf litter. The deepest chamber may be located about 7 cm below the surface, with each chamber up to 1 cm in height. The chambers are specialized to house either brood or prey items. Nests of the widespread species P. mandibularis however, are composed of chambers typically located 2 feet or more below the surface, with entrances that are usually marked by large piles of earth.

Diet
It is believed that millipede eggs may at times constitute the exclusive diet of P. lygaria, while newly emerged millipede young may be an additional food source for the smaller Plectroctena species. Larger species like P. conjugata, P. mandibularis and P. minor specialize on adult millipedes.

Species

 Plectroctena anops Bolton, 1974
 Plectroctena conjugata Santschi, 1914
 Plectroctena cristata Emery, 1899
 Plectroctena cryptica Bolton, 1974
 Plectroctena dentata Santschi, 1912
 Plectroctena gabonensis Santschi, 1919
 Plectroctena gestroi Menozzi, 1922
 Plectroctena hastifera (Santschi, 1914)
 Plectroctena laevior Stitz, 1924
 Plectroctena latinodis Santschi, 1924
 Plectroctena lygaria Bolton, Gotwald & Leroux, 1979
 Plectroctena macgeei Bolton, 1974
 Plectroctena mandibularis F.Smith, 1858
 Plectroctena minor Emery, 1892
 Plectroctena strigosa Emery, 1899
 Plectroctena subterranea Arnold, 1915
 Plectroctena thaui Fisher, 2006
 Plectroctena ugandensis Menozzi, 1933

References

External links

Genus: Plectroctena, AntWeb

Ponerinae
Ant genera
Hymenoptera of Africa